A Corner in Cotton is a five-reel silent film melodrama produced in 1916 by Quality Pictures and distributed by Metro Pictures. The movie was filmed at studios in New York and California and on locations near Savannah, Georgia. A Corner in Cotton was directed by Fred J. Balshofer, with the assistance of Howard Truesdell and adapted for film by Charles A. Taylor from a story by Anita Loos.
 The film was released on February 21, 1916, with Marguerite Snow in the starring role.

Plot
A Corner in Cotton tells the story of Peggy Ainslee, the daughter of a wealthy New York cotton broker, and John Carter, the son of a Southern cotton mill owner. Peggy grows weary of society life and decides to help improve the lot of the poor by becoming involved with the Settlement movement. She later travels south to investigate working conditions at Carter's cotton mill. Peggy manages to gain employment there, but soon attracts the unwanted advances of the mill foreman. John saves her from the would-be masher and the couple eventually fall in love. This becomes a problem with their fathers who had become business antagonist. In the end Peggy and John married after she foils her father's attempt to ruin Carter by cornering the market in cotton and then persuades the two men to settle their differences.

Cast
 Marguerite Snow as Peggy Ainslee
 William Clifford as Richard Ainslee
 Frank Bacon as Col. Robert Carter
 Helen Dunbar as Mrs. Carter
 Wilfred Rogers as John Carter
 Zella Caull as Isabel Rawlston
 Howard Truesdale as Charles Hathaway
 Lester Cuneo as Willis Jackson
 John Goldsworthy as Algie Sherwood

References

External links

1916 films
American silent feature films
Silent American drama films
1916 drama films
American black-and-white films
Melodrama films
Metro Pictures films
Films directed by Fred J. Balshofer
1910s American films